Ted Nace (born 1956) is an American writer, publisher, and environmentalist, known for his criticisms of corporate personhood and his support of a fossil fuel phase out. In 2009, he was described as "one of the amazing brains and strategists behind the anti-coal movement."

He is the founder and Executive Director of Global Energy Monitor.

Early life
Ted Nace was born in California and grew up in Dickinson, North Dakota. In 1974, he graduated from Phillips Academy in Andover, Massachusetts. He received his B.A. from Stanford University, and attended graduate school at University of California Berkeley.

Early career
In the 1970s, Nace worked for the Environmental Defense Fund and analyzed how to replace coal–fired power plants with alternative energy programs through computer simulations. He spent several years working in North Dakota at the Dakota Resource Council, a citizens' group concerned about the impacts of energy development on agriculture and rural communities.

Computer publishing
In the 1980s, Nace began working as an editor for the computer magazine PC World and as a columnist for Publish! and Computer Currents magazine.

In 1985, he founded Peachpit Press with Michael Gardner, initially working out of his apartment in the San Francisco Bay Area. He wrote numerous how–to books on computer–related subjects. At the time, Elaine Weinmann, the computer writer,  described his publishing approach as user-friendly and innovative.

As the company grew in size and sales, it published books about Mac computers and became a leader in books about digital graphics, with a MacBible series, Real World series, and Visual QuickStart (VQS) series. Peachpit published most of the popular manuals of style by writer Robin Williams, such as The Mac is Not a Typewriter and the Little Mac Book.

In 1994, Nace sold Peachpit to Pearson plc and he left the company in 1996.

Writing
In the 1980s, Nace began writing freelance essays, including regular contributions to Orion Magazine.
 
After he left Peachpit, his work increasingly focused on the relation between corporations and democracy in America. He reflected on his own career as a business owner:

Gangs of America
His book Gangs of America: The Rise of Corporate Power and the Disabling of Democracy (2003) argued that corporations have deleterious effects on society and the economy. According to Nace, the specious character of corporation's quasi-legal enablements undermine American democracy. He used about his own experiences watching a coal mine develop in North Dakota to explain his concerns with corporate power:

Nace writes that as the corporate institution developed it got "too much power" in the United States. In an interview, he explained that the modern corporation was a structure that "gelled about a century ago", and that it is a "sort of life form" which has "persistence, metabolism, reproduction, adaptation". He has claimed that the 1886 Supreme Court decision of Santa Clara County v. Southern Pacific Railroad was an example of the "most well known" bad decisions that has granted corporations the same rights as people.

He has criticized the role that business plays in shaping political policy in the last few decades.

A New York Times critic found Nace's Gangs of America to be well-researched and made a compelling case that corporations have too much political power, but the reviewer faulted Nace for ignoring the benefit to American shareholders and for slighting "the contributions the corporate form has made to average Americans' prosperity." Alan T. Saracevic, a reviewer at the San Francisco Chronicle, writes that Gangs of America makes a case that corporations have evolved to an "abusive state of being."

Climate Hope
Nace's second book, Climate Hope: On the Front Lines of the Fight Against Coal (2010) is a first-person chronicle of the anti–coal movement. Tina Gerhardt, the environmental journalist, lauded the book and described its climate agenda as "do-able".

Environmental activism
In the mid 2000s, Nace turned his focus to anti-coal activism. He became active in efforts to block the development and use of coal power plants in the United States through sit–ins at coal mines and banks. At the time, he argued that coal usage was creating a "clear planetary crisis" but that implementing a solution is being blocked by "well-financed lobbying and PR sponsored by the coal and utility companies."

He was described in the Huffington Post as "one of the amazing brains and strategists behind the anti-coal movement."

Global Energy Monitor
In 2007, Nace founded CoalSwarm, a website affiliated with Earth Island Institute, to share information similar to Wikipedia and Citizendium, but focused on coal. In 2009, Coalswarm started a tracker database of global coal-fired power stations that became "widely respected" by academic researchers, media outlets, and governments. In 2018, Coalswarm changed its name to Global Energy Monitor and became an independent organization, expanding coverage to include natural gas pipelines, steel plants, coal mines, and other energy infrastructures.

Publications

Books
 Climate Hope: On the Front Lines of the Fight Against Coal, by Ted Nace, 2010. , 288 pages, paperback.
 Gangs of America: The Rise of Corporate Power and the Disabling of Democracy by Ted Nace, 2003.

Computer publishing
 LaserJet Unlimited, by Ted Nace and Michael Gardner, 1996.
 Desktop Publishing Secrets by Robert C. Eckhardt, Ted Nace, Bob Weibel, October 1991, Peachpit Press
 Ventura Tips and Tricks, 3rd edition, by Ted Nace, Daniel Will-Harris, September 1990, Peachpit Press
 Desktop publishing skills: a primer for typesetting with computer and laser printer, by James Felici, Ted Nace, May 1987, Addison-Wesley Longman Publishing Co., Inc.

References

External links
 Climate Hope: On the Front Lines of the Fight Against Coal, by Ted Nace, 2010. , 288 pages, paperback.
 Gangs of America

Phillips Academy alumni
Stanford University alumni
University of California, Berkeley alumni
People from North Dakota
Writers from San Francisco
Living people
Activists from the San Francisco Bay Area
American non-fiction environmental writers
American publishers (people)
Computer science writers
American book publishers (people)
American business writers
1956 births
People from Dickinson, North Dakota
American male non-fiction writers